is a former Japanese football player and manager.

Playing career
Kishino was born in Shingu on June 13, 1958. After graduating from high school, he joined Mitsubishi Motors in 1977. He could not play in the game and he left in 1980. In 1982, he joined Yomiuri (later Verdy Kawasaki, Tokyo Verdy). He retired in 1990.

Coaching career
After retirement, Kishino started coaching career at Yomiuri in 1991. He coached top team and youth team as assistant coach until 2004. In 2005, he moved to Sagan Tosu and became an assistant coach. In 2007, he was promoted to manager and managed until 2009. In 2010, he signed with Yokohama FC. In March 2012, he was sacked. In 2015, he signed with Kataller Toyama, but in August, he was sacked.

Club statistics

Managerial statistics

References

External links

1958 births
Living people
Association football people from Wakayama Prefecture
Japanese footballers
Japan Soccer League players
Urawa Red Diamonds players
Tokyo Verdy players
Japanese football managers
J1 League managers
J2 League managers
J3 League managers
Tokyo Verdy managers
Sagan Tosu managers
Yokohama FC managers
Kataller Toyama managers
Association football defenders
People from Shingū, Wakayama